Pseudomonas aurantiaca is an orange Gram-negative soil bacterium, originally isolated from the rhizosphere soil of potatoes. It produces di-2,4-diacetylfluoroglucylmethan, which is antibiotically active against Gram-positive organisms. It has shown potential for use as a biocontrol agent against plant-pathogenic microbes. Based on 16S rRNA analysis, P. aurantiaca has been placed in the P. chlororaphis group.

Isolates found in Ukraine living in root symbiosis produce 2,4-Diacetylphloroglucinol to control Fusarium oxysporum.

References 

Pseudomonadales
Bacteria described in 1948